Hindsight is an American comedy-drama television series that premiered on VH1 on January 7, 2015, and ended on March 11, 2015. The series was created by Emily Fox and stars Laura Ramsey in the lead role of Becca Brady. Becca wishes she had lived her life differently, and finds herself sent back to 1995, with her knowledge and experience and a chance to do things differently.

On March 16, 2015, VH1 announced that the show was renewed for a second season, but after a change in leadership at VH1 Hindsight was cancelled in August 2015.

Premise
Becca Brady is wrestling with doubts on the eve of her second wedding, her first wedding having ended in divorce. Although she loves her fiancé Andy, he is not as exciting as her first husband Sean. Trapped in the elevator she wishes she could have done things differently the first time round. She awakes to find herself in 1995, confused and at first not even believing it is real; Becca has time traveled to the day of her first wedding. 
Becca realizes she is reliving her life, and has the chance to correct what she sees as personal and professional mistakes.

She reunites with her best friend Lolly, from whom she had become estranged in present day. With the knowledge that her first marriage turned from passion to constant arguments and that Sean never managed to achieve in his career as an artist, she decides she cannot go through with the wedding and she breaks off her engagement. Becca also knows her job as an assistant is a dead end and decides not to tolerate the constant petty demands of her high-maintenance boss Simon, and asks for promotion. Ultimately she quits and pursues a new uncertain career path.

Becca does not know if she can change her fate, or if she is destined to repeat some of the same mistakes, but she resolves to try and do things differently.

Production
The series was originally developed for NBC in 2009. VH1 were looking to develop their own scripted television series and were looking to adopt already developed projects, and the show only required a small changes to fit VH1. The time leap had originally been to 1999, but was pushed back to 1995 when the show moved to VH1.

The series was renewed for a second season but later cancelled after a change in leadership at VH1. The whole of the second season had already been mapped out, and the writers were in the process of writing episode five. Fox said they had only ended season 1 on a cliffhanger because they already knew that had been renewed.

The show included a companion web series called Planet Sebastian. It was streamed on the VH1 website and featured recurring character Sebastian Wexler, video store manager and Lolly's boss, running his own public access style talk show.

Cast 

Main
 Laura Ramsey as Becca Brady
 Sarah Goldberg as Lolly Lavigne
 Craig Horner as Sean Reeves
 Nick Clifford as Andy Kelly
 John Patrick Amedori as Jamie Brady
 Jessy Hodges as Melanie Morelli
 Drew Sidora as Paige Hill

Recurring
 Donna Murphy as Georgie Brady
 Adam Herschman as Sebastian Wexler
 Collins Pennie as Xavier
 Alexandra Chando as Noelle
 Steve Talley as Kevin
 Joshua Mikel as Stanton
 Brian Kerwin as Lincoln Brady
 Lauren Boyd as Lois
 Liz Holtan as Phoebe
 Briana Venskus as Victoria
 Charlie Bodin as Chester
 Dominick Vicchiullo as Grumpy Rick

Guest
 Mario Cantone as Simon

Episodes

Reception
On Rotten Tomatoes it has an approval rating of 100% based on reviews from 12 critics, with an average rating of 7.5 out of 10. The site's critical consensus states: "An earnest sense of humor, excellent characters, and 90s nostalgia all work together to make Hindsight a fun and charming little romp." On Metacritic, the series has a score of 72 out of 100 based on reviews from 8 critics, indicating "generally favorable reviews".

Reviews of the series seem positive in general. Variety called the show “breezy” with an intriguing premise while also pointing out that, like many time travel stories, the narrative doesn't necessarily stand up to scrutiny. Rolling Stone praised the relationship between Becca and Lolly while noting the show's use of ‘90s pop culture archetypes to invoke nostalgia. Vulture called the show’s vision "perfect," while The New York Times called the show "clever, affecting and sly" and a "credible period dramedy, somewhere between Beverly Hills, 90210 and Friends, and an armchair rumination on destiny and will."

Music
Music, particularly music from the 1990s, is used heavily in the series and as a significant part of the network's promotion of the show. Creator Emily Fox said she didn't want the big number one songs but wanted "the one that sort of reaches into the back of your consciousness, that flicks this switch that hasn't been flicked in 15 years." 
Fox praised music supervisor Jon Ernst for his song selections and his ability to get the necessary licensing at reasonable cost. The show was able to license most of the music using three-year deals. Music used during the series includes:

International broadcast

In Southeast Asia, the series was broadcast on cable and satellite channel Star World beginning in August 2016.

In Germany, the series was broadcast on the Disney Channel beginning March 30, 2017.

References

External links
 
 Website

2010s American comedy-drama television series
2010s American comic science fiction television series
2010s American time travel television series
2015 American television series debuts
2015 American television series endings
English-language television shows
Television series set in 1995
Television shows set in New York City
American time travel television series
VH1 original programming
Television series by Sony Pictures Television
Television series set in the 1990s